Leon Donohue (March 25, 1939 – August 11, 2016) was an American football offensive guard in the National Football League (NFL) for the San Francisco 49ers and Dallas Cowboys. He played college football at San Jose State University.

Early years
Donohue attended James Lick High School, where he played football and basketball. He was named All-City in both sports. 

He accepted a football scholarship from San Jose State University. As a sophomore, he was converted from end into a tackle and became a starter.

He was inducted into the San Jose State Sports Hall of Fame and the East Side Unified School District of San Jose Hall of Fame. In 1995, he was named to the San Jose State Football's "All-Century Team" by the San Jose Mercury News.

Professional career

San Francisco 49ers
Donohue was selected by the San Francisco 49ers as a future draft pick in the ninth round (118th overall) of the 1961 NFL Draft, which allowed them to draft him one year before his college eligibility was over. He was also selected by the Oakland Raiders of the American Football League in the 29th round (225th overall) of the 1962 AFL Draft. In his second year he was named the regular starter at right guard.

On September 6, 1965, he was traded to the Dallas Cowboys in exchange for a third round selection (#37-Al Randolph).

Dallas Cowboys
Donohue was the starter at right guard during three seasons and was especially strong in pass protection. He  was a part of the 1967 NFL Championship Game famously known as the "Ice Bowl", where the Green Bay Packers beat the Cowboys 21 - 17.

After playing with a bad knee in 1967, he had off-season surgery. He couldn't recover well enough from the knee injury and was placed on the injured reserve list during the 1968 season. On July 21, 1969, he was traded to the Detroit Lions in exchange for a draft selection (not exercised).

Detroit Lions
In 1969, the Detroit Lions acquired Donohue to improve their depth at the offensive line, but he was not able to make the team due to problems with his knee and retired.

Personal life
Donohue became a football, wrestling and tennis coach at Shasta College in Redding. In 1977, he was named the football head coach and went on to win or share four league titles. He retired after the 1995 season and was inducted into the Shasta College Sports Hall of Fame in 2002. He also was inducted into the Shasta County Hall of Fame. He died on August 11, 2016.

References

External links
Shasta College coaching legend Donohue dies at 77

1939 births
2016 deaths
Players of American football from San Jose, California
American football offensive guards
San Francisco 49ers players
San Jose State Spartans football players
Dallas Cowboys players
Junior college football coaches in the United States
People from Star City, Arkansas